Statistics of Kuwaiti Premier League in the 1972–73 season.

Overview
Al Qadisiya Kuwait won the championship.

References
RSSSF

1972–73
1972–73 in Asian association football leagues
football